Cedrus Residential also known as the Cedrus Dream Garden Tower is a residential building in Tehran. The contemporary building is located in the wealthy area of Sa'adat Abad and features a facade of staggered and walled balconies. In 2019 the building won first prize at the World Architecture Festival in the "Completed Building Housing category".

Background 
The building was designed by Tehran-based architect Alireza Taghaboni of Next Office. The architect designed the building to deal with the overcrowding in Tehran. The building is located district 3 in Sa'adat Abad, which is considered a developed and wealthy area or Tehran.

Design 

The design uses layered balconies and open floor plans. The building is made from brick. The design of the balconies was an effort to accommodate the private and public life of the occupants. The building is 14 stories tall: three floors below ground, and eleven above. The third floor has a game room, a pool, a sauna, and a Jacuzzi.

Reception 
In 2019 the building won first prize at the World Architecture Festival in the "Completed Building Housing category".

References 

Buildings and structures completed in 2018
Buildings and structures in Tehran
Architecture in Iran